Sheri-Ann Brooks (born 11 February 1983 in Kingston) is a Jamaican sprinter, who specializes in the 100 metres.

She is the first child of Mr. Error Brooks and Mrs. Donna Brooks.

Brooks represented the Jamaica at the 2008 Summer Olympics in Beijing. She competed at the 4 x 100 metres relay together with Shelly-Ann Fraser, Aleen Bailey and Veronica Campbell-Brown. In its first round heat, Jamaica placed first in front of Russia, Germany and China. The Jamaica relay's time of 42.24 seconds was the first time overall out of sixteen participating nations. With this result, Jamaica qualified for the final, replacing Brooks and Bailey with Sherone Simpson and Kerron Stewart. Jamaica did not finish the race due to a mistake in the baton exchange.

She qualified for the 100 m at the 2009 World Championships in Athletics with a third-place finish at the Jamaican national championships, behind Fraser and Stewart.

In June, 2009, Brooks was one of five members of the Jamaica national team who were reported for providing urine samples that tested positive for a banned stimulant. Brooks was cleared to continue racing on a technicality, however, as the Jamaican Anti-Doping Commission had tested her B-sample without her prior knowledge. Nevertheless, the Jamaica Amateur Athletic Association withdrew her from the relay race at the World Championships as a precaution.

Achievements

Personal bests
100 metres – 11.05 s (2007)
200 metres – 22.78 s (2007)
400 metres – 53.95 s (2006)

References
 

1983 births
Living people
Jamaican female sprinters
Commonwealth Games gold medallists for Jamaica
Athletes (track and field) at the 2006 Commonwealth Games
Athletes (track and field) at the 2008 Summer Olympics
Athletes (track and field) at the 2007 Pan American Games
Olympic athletes of Jamaica
Sportspeople from Kingston, Jamaica
Doping cases in athletics
Jamaican sportspeople in doping cases
World Athletics Championships medalists
Commonwealth Games medallists in athletics
Pan American Games gold medalists for Jamaica
Pan American Games silver medalists for Jamaica
Pan American Games medalists in athletics (track and field)
Commonwealth Games gold medallists in athletics
World Athletics Championships winners
Medalists at the 2007 Pan American Games
Olympic female sprinters
21st-century Jamaican women
Medallists at the 2006 Commonwealth Games